Rozy Akmammedovich Redzhepov (born 28 November 1969) is a Turkmenistan wrestler. He competed in the men's Greco-Roman 90 kg at the 1996 Summer Olympics.

References

External links
 

1969 births
Living people
Turkmenistan male sport wrestlers
Olympic wrestlers of Turkmenistan
Wrestlers at the 1996 Summer Olympics
Place of birth missing (living people)
Wrestlers at the 1998 Asian Games
Asian Games competitors for Turkmenistan
20th-century Turkmenistan people